Jacques Marie Lucien Raoul Simonpaoli (24 November 1887 – 23 March 1960) was a French athlete, boxer, wrestler, rower and actor. Aged 12, he served as a coxswain in the French coxed pair and won a bronze medal at the 1900 Summer Olympics. He competed in the shot put, his favourite event, at the 1912, 1920, 1924 and 1928 Summer Olympics with the best result of ninth place in 1924. In 1912 he also took part in the Greco-Roman wrestling contest and served as the Olympic flag bearer for France, and in 1928 he finished 29th in the discus throw.

Paoli was a French champion in boxing and rugby, with Stade Français. He played three international rugby games for the French national rugby union team in 1911–12 and scored one try. In the 1920s he was romantically involved with the fellow athlete Violette Morris. In 1933 he co-founded the French Professional Wrestling Association.

Partial filmography
 La Souriante Madame Beudet (1922)
 Possession (1922)
 Terror (1924)
 Madame Sans-Gêne (1925)
 Nitchevo (1926)
 Senorita (1927)
 The Coward (1927)
 The Magic Flame (1927)
 Beau Sabreur (1928)
 Woman Wise (1928)
 The Olympic Hero (1928)
 A Night of Mystery (1928)
 Safety in Numbers (1930)
 The Big Trail (1931)

References

External links

1887 births
1960 deaths
20th-century French male actors
French male film actors
French male silent film actors
French male professional wrestlers
French male rowers
French rugby union players
Stade Français players
Olympic athletes of France
Olympic rowers of France
Olympic wrestlers of France
Olympic bronze medalists for France
Rowers at the 1900 Summer Olympics
Wrestlers at the 1912 Summer Olympics
French male sport wrestlers
Athletes (track and field) at the 1912 Summer Olympics
Athletes (track and field) at the 1920 Summer Olympics
Athletes (track and field) at the 1924 Summer Olympics
Athletes (track and field) at the 1928 Summer Olympics
French male shot putters
French male discus throwers
Medalists at the 1900 Summer Olympics
French male boxers
Coxswains (rowing)
Sportspeople from Eure-et-Loir